Need for Speed Payback is a racing video game developed by Ghost Games and published by Electronic Arts for PlayStation 4, Windows, and Xbox One. It is the twenty-third installment in the Need for Speed series. The game was released worldwide on November 10, 2017, with mixed reviews from critics. The game was succeeded by Need for Speed Heat in 2019.

Gameplay 
Need for Speed Payback is a racing game set in an open world environment of Fortune Valley; a fictional version of Las Vegas, Nevada. It is focused on "action driving" and has three playable characters (each with different sets of skills) working together to pull off action movie-like sequences. In contrast with the previous game, it also features a 24-hour day-night cycle. Unlike the 2015 Need for Speed reboot, Payback includes an offline single-player mode.

Payback features a total of 74 vehicles with downloadable contents. Toyota, Scion and Ferrari are not involved in the game due to licensing issues. However, the Subaru BRZ appears in the game. Aston Martin, Audi, Buick, Jaguar, Koenigsegg, Land Rover, Mercury, Pagani, and Plymouth make their return after their absence from the 2015 installment, while Alfa Romeo, Infiniti, Mini and Pontiac were added via downloadable content.

Plot 
Tyler "Ty" Morgan (Jack Derges), Sean "Mac" McAlister (David Ajala), Jessica "Jess" Miller (Jessica Madsen) and mechanic Ravindra "Rav" Chaudhry (Ramon Tikaram) are part of a crew in Silver Rock, Fortune Valley. Fixer Lina Navarro (Dominique Tipper) tasks them with stealing a precious Koenigsegg Regera belonging to Marcus "The Gambler" Weir. However, as Tyler arrives at the drop point, he finds Rav knocked out. Lina appears, revealing that she set up Tyler and his crew to take the fall for the stolen car and she drives away, leaving them at the mercy of the oncoming police force. Upon learning that Lina betrayed both of them, Weir initially considers leaving Tyler to be arrested, but instead protects Tyler, planning their revenge.

Six months later, working as a valet for Weir, Tyler spots Lina threatening Weir to hand over the casino to The House, a cartel who controls Fortune Valley's underworld. Frustrated at the lack of progress, he decides to take matters into his own hands. Contacting The House as a racer, he enters a race and wins it, despite Lina having rigged the race for profit. Weir proposes Tyler a way to take down The House and Lina along with it. Tyler is to enter and win "The Outlaw's Rush", a massive street racing event that has the nation's top racers participating, which The House plans to rig for their own ends. Tyler reassembles his old crew and they successfully defeat all rivaling racing leagues and are thus allowed to enter "The Outlaw's Rush". Simultaneously, Jess infiltrates the House and learns of their plans to take over the entire city.

At "The Outlaw's Rush", Tyler manages to win both the street and the offroad event with the help of all the race crews they allied with during the game, and in the end, defeats Navarro herself. Thus, Navarro and "The Collector" are defeated and the House's hold over Silver Rock is broken.

In a post-credits scene, Mr. Kobashi, a customer whom Jess had driven, calls Weir and tells him his gamble worked, and that "The Collector" is finished. He welcomes Weir to Arkwright, the true power behind the House.

Development 
In January 2016, Ghost Games began development on the next Need for Speed game to be released in 2017. Electronic Arts later confirmed in their January 2017 earnings call that the next game in the franchise was in development and set to be launched during EA's fiscal year 2018 (comprising from April 2017 to March 2018).

Reception 

Need for Speed Payback received "mixed or average" reviews from critics, according to review aggregator Metacritic.

Luke Reilly of IGN praised Electronic Arts for repairing the problems of the game's predecessor, Need for Speed, but criticized its "scripted" story, lack of police chases during free roam, scripted police chases, loot box-like mechanisms during customization, poor car handling, unrealistic car damage and several other issues. PC World criticized the game for being full of microtransactions, the severely limited customizability of cars, gameplay mechanics, a lack of cockpit view and several more issues, and compared it harshly to the  Forza Horizon series.

According to The NPD Group, Payback was the eighth best-selling title in the United States in November 2017.

Notes

References

External links 
 
 

 23
2017 video games
Electronic Arts games
Frostbite (game engine) games
Multiplayer and single-player video games
Open-world video games
Organized crime video games
PlayStation 4 games
Racing video games set in the United States
Video games containing loot boxes
Video games developed in Sweden
Video games scored by Joseph Trapanese
Windows games
Xbox One games